Aa maderoi is a species of orchid in the genus Aa. It is native to Ecuador, Colombia, and Venezuela.

References

maderoi
Plants described in 1920